Sandro Platzgummer (born March 10, 1997) is an Austrian professional American football running back who is a free agent. He previously played in Europe for the Swarco Raiders Tirol and the Austria national American football team.

Career

Swarco Raiders Tirol
In Austria, Platzgummer played for the Swarco Raiders Tirol of Innsbruck in the Austrian Football League. He played with the Raiders for five seasons and won two European championships with the team.

New York Giants
Platzgummer came to the National Football League and in turn the New York Giants via the International Player Pathway Program.
In 2021, Platzgummer made a 48 yard rush for a touchdown in a preseason game against the New York Jets.

On March 28, 2022, Platzgummer re-signed with the Giants.

Personal life
Platzgummer has also been studying to become a medical doctor.

References

1997 births
Living people
American football running backs
New York Giants players
Austrian players of American football
International Player Pathway Program participants